Alan Keir Bowman, FBA (born 23 May 1944) is a British classicist and academic. He was Camden Professor of Ancient History at the University of Oxford from 2002 to 2010, and Principal of Brasenose College, Oxford, from 2011 to 2015.

Early life
Bowman was born on 23 May 1944 in Manchester, United Kingdom. He was educated at Manchester Grammar School, The Queen's College, Oxford and the University of Toronto.

Academic career
After holding academic positions at Rutgers University and the  University of Manchester he was elected as University Lecturer in Ancient History at Oxford University and Official Student of Christ Church, Oxford.  He was Senior Censor at Christ Church from 1988 to 1990.

In 1995 Bowman became founding Director of the Centre for the Study of Ancient Documents at Oxford. In 2002 he became Camden Professor of Ancient History and Fellow of Brasenose College.

In 1996, Bowman co-edited volume 10 of the Cambridge Ancient History second edition series, entitled The Augustan Empire, 43 BC - AD 69. As well as co-editing the volume, he also contributed the chapter on 'Provincial Administration and Taxation'. His fellow editors were Andrew Lintott, also of Oxford, and Edward Champlin, of Princeton University.

References

External links 
 Prof. Alan K. Bowman MA, PhD (Tor) FBA Faculty homepage
 Vindolanda Tablets Online

 

1944 births
Living people
People educated at Manchester Grammar School
Alumni of The Queen's College, Oxford
British classical scholars
Historians of ancient Rome
Fellows of the British Academy
Fellows of Brasenose College, Oxford
Principals of Brasenose College, Oxford
University of Toronto alumni
Fellows of the Society of Antiquaries of London
Rutgers University faculty
Academics of the Victoria University of Manchester
Camden Professors of Ancient History
Presidents of The Roman Society